The role of Flemish Government Architect (Vlaams Bouwmeester in Dutch) was established in 1998 under Minister-President of Flanders Van den Brande to develop Architectural Design Policy in Flanders, Belgium.

Function 

The Flemish Government Architect is commissioned to develop a long-term spatial vision, in consultation with the different administrations and with external stakeholders, to contribute to the preparation and implementation of the architecture policy of the Flemish government. The goal of this independent body in the government is to help create a high quality architectural living environment in Flanders, which was inspired by the Chief Government Architect of the Netherlands.

One of the main tasks of the Flemish Government Architect is selecting designers for public contracts. The Open Call is a list of public projects published twice per year to which designers can apply.

Overview of Flemish Government Architects 

2016–present Leo Van Broeck
2015 - 2016 (acting) Stefan Devoldere
2010 - 2015 Peter Swinnen
2005 - 2010 Marcel Smets
1999 - 2005 Bob Van Reeth

Awards 
Prijs Wivina Demeester (previous: Prijs Bouwheer / Prijs Bouwmeester)

External links 

 Flemish Government Architect
 Brussels Bouwmeester 
 Charleroi Bouwmeester
 Antwerpse Stadsbouwmeester
Stadsbouwmeester Gent
 Rijksbouwmeester Nederland

1998 establishments in Belgium
Architecture in Belgium